Cha Oh-yeon (born 15 April 1998) is a Korean footballer currently playing as a midfielder for Cheonan City FC.

Club career
Cha Oh-yeon joined FC Seoul in 2020.

On 7 August 2020, Cha Oh-Yeon debuted in K League 1

ON 6th January 2023, he was loaned to Cheonan City FC of K League 2.

Career statistics

Club

References

External links
 }

1998 births
Living people
South Korean footballers
South Korea youth international footballers
Association football midfielders
K League 1 players
FC Seoul players
Competitors at the 2019 Summer Universiade
People from Uijeongbu
Sportspeople from Gyeonggi Province